{{DISPLAYTITLE:C19H28ClN5O}}
The molecular formula C19H28ClN5O (molar mass: 377.91 g/mol, exact mass: 377.1982 u) may refer to:

 CJ-033466
 Etoperidone

Molecular formulas